Spier, Rohns & Gehrke was a noted Detroit, Michigan architectural firm operated by Frederick H. Spier and William C. Rohns, best remembered for designs of churches and railroad stations. These were frequently executed in the Richardson Romanesque style. F.H. Spier, W.C. Rohns and Hans Gehrke were authors of the Detroit Chamber of Commerce, tallest building in the city at the time of construction (1895). Hans Gehrke's well known structures include the Fire Department Headquarters on Larned Street in Detroit (currently Hotel "Foundation"), and residence of Robert C. Traub in Arden Park residential district of Detroit.

Notable commissions
 Michigan Central Railroad depot (since 1969 the Gandy Dancer Restaurant and Roadhouse Saloon), 401 Depot Street, Ann Arbor, Michigan, 1886
 Michigan Central Railroad depot, 210 East Michigan Avenue, Grass Lake, Michigan, 1887
 Kelsey Museum of Archaeology of the University of Michigan, built as the Newberry-Hall-Student Christian Association building, Ann Arbor, Michigan, 1888
 Michigan Central Railroad depot, (as of 2009 the Niles Amtrak Station), 598 Dey Street, Niles, Michigan, 1890
 Gethsemane Evangelical Lutheran Church, Detroit, 1891
 Sweetest Heart of Mary Roman Catholic Church, Detroit, 1892
 University of Michigan - Tappan Hall, Ann Arbor, Michigan, 1893
 Detroit Chamber of Commerce Building, (currently named United Way Community Services Building, Detroit, 1895 (the tallest building in Detroit at the time of its construction)
St. Thomas the Apostle Catholic Church, Ann Arbor, Michigan, 1897
 Saline First Presbyterian Church, 143 E. Michigan Ave., Saline, Michigan, 1898
 Union Depot (Lansing, Michigan), 637 East Michigan Avenue, Lansing, Michigan, 1902 (Since 1978 - Clara's Restaurant)
 Grand Trunk Western Station, 1203 South Washington Avenue, Lansing, Michigan, 1902
 Durand Union Station, 200 Railroad Street, Durand, Michigan, 1903
 Grand Trunk Railway Station, India Street at Fore Street, Portland, Maine, 1903 (razed 1966)
 West Medical - University of Michigan (now the Dana Building), Ann Arbor, Michigan, 1903
 Grand Trunk Railway Allandale station, 285 Bradford Street, Barrie, Ontario, L4N, Canada, 1904
 Grand Trunk Railway depot, 175 Main Street, Battle Creek, Michigan, 1906
 Detroit and Mackinac Railway station, 10th Street and Fair Avenue, Alpena, Michigan, 1911
 Belle Isle Skating Pavilion - Belle Isle Park (Michigan), Detroit, Michigan, 1893 (Demolished 1950)
 The Architects' Directory and Specification Index, Volume 10, 1913, p.70
 St. Mary Star of the Sea Catholic Church (Jackson, Michigan)

Gallery

References

Defunct architecture firms based in Michigan
American railway architects